Caprimimodes is a monotypic moth genus in the family Erebidae. Its single species, Caprimimodes mimetica, is found in Papua New Guinea. Both the genus and species were first described by Walter Rothschild in 1913.

References

Nudariina
Monotypic moth genera
Moths described in 1913
Moths of Oceania